Girish Pandurang Kulkarni (born 25 November 1977) is an Indian actor, writer, and producer. He is a recipient of two National Film Awards namely, National Film Award for Best Actor in 2011 for his performance in Deool and National Film Award for Best Screenplay for the same film. He is well known for Marathi films such as Valu, Vihir, Deool, Gabhricha Paus and Jaundya Na Balasaheb. He is known to Hindi audiences for his role in the Aamir Khan starrer Dangal and Anurag Kashyap's movie Ugly. He received acclaim for his portrayal of gangster 'Appa' in the 2017 Marathi crime thriller Faster Fene opposite Amey Wagh. He also starred in India's first Netflix original series Sacred Games.

Personal life

Kulkarni was born on 25 November 1977 in the Paranda Taluka of Osmanabad district and grew up in Pune. He pursued his Diploma in Mechanical Engineering from Puranmal Lahoti Government Polytechnic Latur. He was involved in local stage plays. After Post Graduation, he worked for private IT companies for a while but soon enough he decided to pursue a career in writing. Kulkarni then joined the Marathi film industry.

Career
Kulkarni began his career as a Cluster Programming Head for Radio Mirchi.

Valu, released in 2008, was a light, enjoyable movie portraying various stereotypical characters found in an Indian village through the simple story of a wild bull which needs to be captured. Inspired by his observations, and many of the characters he writes reflect authentic village people.

In 2009's Gabhricha Paus, he portrayed the tragic story of an Indian farmer from a small village in Vidarbha, who is suffering because of sparse rain, evil money lenders and the negligence of the Indian government towards farmers. His second release in 2009, Vihir, was an abstract movie which told the story of an adolescent boy who sets out to understand the meaning of life and death after his cousin and close friend dies. Vihir was screened at Berlin International Film Festival in 2010 and garnered praise and critical appreciation from all over the world.

His following movie Deool, released in 2011, which depicted how politicians manipulate the beliefs of innocent masses in the name of God. The film earned him two National Film Awards, for best actor and for best screenplay.

His next writing and acting venture in Marathi cinema, the movie Masala released in 2012 quickly became a family favourite, unveiling new aspects of his talents. In 2013, he made his acting debut in Bollywood with film-maker Anurag Kashyap's thriller Ugly, in which his performance as the inadvertently funny cop brought him the attention and praise of the industry as well as the masses.

Currently, work on his upcoming films is underway. His next is a Marathi movie titled Highway, starring Huma Qureshi and Tisca Chopra, which he has written, acted in, and co-produced. He is also working on a comedy film, with which he will mark his directorial debut, apart from acting in it.

He has acted as the National coach for Geeta Phogat in the acclaimed movie Dangal (film). The character had shades of grey and is shown to have issues with on-screen Mahavir Phogat. This was his biggest role in Bollywood, with Dangal earning over $300 million to become the 5th highest grossing non-English film of all time. He was also seen in Kaabil as Inspector Nalawade. Later in 2017, Kulkarni portrayed local gangster Appa in Faster Fene, based on the popular book series written by Bhaskar Ramachandra Bhagwat.

In 2018, Kulkarni portrayed politician Bipin Bhonsle in the Netflix original Sacred Games, based on the 2006 thriller by Vikram Chandra of the same name. With a star studded cast, including Saif Ali Khan, Nawazuddin Siddiqui, and Radhika Apte, Sacred Games has been lauded by critics as one of the best web series to come out of India.

Filmography

Films

Web series

Awards
 2011 Deool - National Film Award for Best Actor
 2011 Deool - National Film Award for Best Screenplay (Best Dialogue)
 2017 Jaundyana Balasaheb - Zee Chitra Gaurav 2017

References

External links

 
 

1977 births
Living people
Male actors in Marathi cinema
Indian male film actors
Male actors from Pune
Indian male screenwriters
Best Actor National Film Award winners
21st-century Indian male actors
Screenwriters from Maharashtra
Film producers from Maharashtra
Marathi film producers
Marathi screenwriters
Best Dialogue National Film Award winners